Alfred Wallace Gbordzor Abayateye (born October 20, 1965) is a banker and politician. He was the former member of parliament for the Sege constituency in the Greater Accra region of Ghana.

Early life and education 
Abayateye was born in 1965. He comes from Anyamam-Ada in the Greater Accra region of Ghana. He studied Accounting in the University of Ghana, where he earned a Diploma in 1987.

Personal life and career 
Abayateye is a Christian and married with six children. He worships with the Presbyterian Church of Ghana. He is an Accountant by profession and currently the Deputy Manager of Bank of Ghana.

Politics 
Abayateye began his political career in 2004 when he became a member of parliament of the 4th parliament of the 4th republic of Ghana for the Sege constituency on the ticket of the National Democratic Congress. He won the Sege seat again in 2008 and became a 5th parliament of the 4th republic of Ghana, also on the ticket of the NDC. He won the seat with a total number of 12,451 votes out of the 19,182 valid votes cast making 64.9%. He lost his seat in the NDC 2012 parliamentary primaries to Christian Corletey Otuteye.

References 

Living people
1965 births
National Democratic Congress (Ghana) politicians
Ghanaian MPs 2005–2009
Ghanaian MPs 2009–2013
Ghanaian accountants
Ghanaian Presbyterians